Francis John Murphy (20 February 1905 – 25 May 1995) was an Australian rules footballer who played with Collingwood in the Victorian Football League (VFL).

Murphy was a half-forward as a member of a successful Collingwood side played in four premierships, three of them with his brother Len. After leaving the club in 1935, he moved to Western Australia, where he became captain-coach of Subiaco in the Western Australian Football League and the Kalgoorlie City Football Club in the Goldfields Football League.

Murphy later served in the Royal Australian Air Force during World War II.

References

External links

Frank Murphy's playing statistics from WAFL Footy Facts

1905 births
1995 deaths
Collingwood Football Club players
Collingwood Football Club Premiership players
Subiaco Football Club players
Subiaco Football Club coaches
Australian rules footballers from Victoria (Australia)
Four-time VFL/AFL Premiership players